James D. Bissell (born 1951) is an American production designer.

Early life
Jim Bissell was born in Charleston, South Carolina, the only child of Elizabeth and James Bissell. In his youth, he moved around and traveled with his father from Hawaii to Bermuda and so many places in between. After he graduated high school Bissell attended University of North Carolina at Chapel Hill working in the theater department. In 1973 Bissell graduated with a BFA and decided to make it New York. He made it by working on low-budget features and commercials.

Career
Bissell soon moved to Los Angeles to exploit his talent in the entertainment capital of the world. He found steady work on the set of the television series Palmerstown, U.S.A.. In 1980 he was awarded an Emmy for his work on the show, and around that time he was discovered by Steven Spielberg while he was shooting on the same lot. Bissell would later receive a BAFTA nomination for production design on Spielberg's next project E.T. the Extra-Terrestrial.
While working on Jumanji (1995) Bissell met his wife Martha.
Bissell's collaboration with George Clooney began in 2002 with Confessions Of A Dangerous Mind, followed by Good Night, and Good Luck which landed him an Oscar nomination, Leatherheads, The Monuments Men, Suburbicon, and most recently The Midnight Sky.

Little known fact:  when working on Nick Castle's The Boy Who Could Fly, "Bissell-ing" was invented.  It started at a dinner with Bissell, Castle, Ron Cobb, and their wives.  The rule became: you cannot drink the wine until you have Bisselled - Which involves, dropping the cork onto a plate repeatedly until the cork stands up on one end.  We have tried to propagate this throughout the world and currently, Nick Castle the Bissell-ing record - 3-corks simultaneously!  Give Bissilling a try!

Personal life
Bissell is married to Martha Wynne. Jim and Martha have three children: James Dougal (from Bissell's previous marriage), Alexander Wynne (born 1996) and Elizabeth Wynne (born 1998).

He is a known Joseph Campbell fan.

This is all that is known about this mysterious figure.

Awards
Bissell won the Emmy for "Outstanding Art Direction for a Series" for his work on "Palmerstown, U.S.A." 
Bissell was Nominated for the BAFTA for "Best Production Design/Art Direction" for his work on "E.T. the Extra-Terrestrial."
Bissell has been nominated for three different Art Directors Guild Awards for his work on "Good Night, and Good Luck.", "300", and "The Spiderwick Chronicles" 
Bissell was nominated at the 78th Academy Awards in the category of Best Art Direction for his work on the movie Good Night, and Good Luck. His nomination was shared with Jan Pascale.
In 2015 he received the Art Directors Guild lifetime achievement award.

References

External links

Living people
American art directors
1952 births
Artists from Charleston, South Carolina
Primetime Emmy Award winners